The Battle of Broken Hill was a fatal incident which took place in Australia near Broken Hill, New South Wales, on 1 January 1915. Two men shot dead four people and wounded seven more, before being killed by police and military officers. Though politically and religiously motivated, the men were not members of any sanctioned armed force and the attacks were criminal. The two men were later identified as Muslim "Ghans" from colonial India (some sources incorrectly identify them as Turkish).

The assailants

The attackers were both former camel-drivers working at Broken Hill. They were Badsha Mahommed Gool (born c. 1874), an ice-cream vendor, and Mullah Abdullah (born c. 1854), a local imam and halal butcher.

Gool's ice-cream cart was well known in town and was used to transport the men to the attack site. They also fashioned a home-made Ottoman flag which they flew. There appears to have been little effort made at hiding their identities.

Abdullah had arrived in Broken Hill around 1898 and worked as a camel driver. Several days before the killings Mullah Adbullah was convicted by Police Court for slaughtering sheep on premises not licensed for slaughter. It was not his first offence. Since the sanitary inspector, Mr. Brosnan, acting to enforce the municipal regulations, observed that the unauthorised slaughter was insanitary, he acted to enforce the law. In addition, Abdullah had ceased wearing his turban years before, "since the day some larrikin threw stones at me, and I did not like it".

Attack
Each New Year's Day the local lodge of the Manchester Unity Order of Oddfellows held a picnic at Silverton. The train from Broken Hill to Silverton was crowded with 1200 picnickers on 40 open ore trucks. Three kilometres out of town, Gool and Abdullah positioned themselves on an embankment located about 30 metres from the tracks. As the train passed they opened fire with two rifles, discharging 20 to 30 shots.

The picnickers initially thought that the shots were being discharged in honour of the train's passing, as a sham fight, or as target practice. Once their companions started falling, the reality sank in.

Alma Cowie, aged 17 died instantly. William John Shaw, a foreman in the Sanitary Department, was killed on the train and his daughter Lucy Shaw was injured. Six other people on the train were injured: Mary Kavanagh, George Stokes, Thomas Campbell, Alma Crocker, Rose Crabb and Constable Robert Mills.

The conductor on the train was "Tiger" Dick (Eric Edward) Nyholm, soon to be a father of six children, including Sir Ronald Nyholm, also of Broken Hill. Nyholm was a renowned marksman and proved instrumental in protecting the train's passengers from further injury.

Police response
Gool and Mullah Abdullah made their way from the train towards the West Camel camp where they lived. On the way they killed Alfred E. Millard who had taken shelter in his hut. By this time the train had pulled over at a siding and the police were telephoned. The police contacted Lieutenant Resch at the local army base who despatched his men. When police encountered Gool and Abdullah near the Cable Hotel, the pair shot and wounded Constable Mills. Gool and Abdullah then took shelter within a white quartz outcrop, which provided good cover. A 90-minute gun battle followed, during which armed members of the public arrived to join the police and military. By the end of the battle very little shooting came from the pair and most of it was off target, leading Constable Ward to conclude that Mullah Abdullah was already dead and Gool was wounded.

James Craig, a 69-year-old occupant of a house behind the Cable Hotel, resisted his daughter's warning about chopping wood during a gun battle and was hit by a stray bullet and killed. He was the fourth to die.

At "one o'clock a rush took place to the Turks' stronghold". An eyewitness later stated that Gool had stood with a white rag tied to his rifle but was cut down by gunfire. He was found with 16 wounds. The mob would not allow Abdullah's body to be taken away in the ambulance. Later that day both bodies were disposed of in secret by the police.

Aftermath

Immediate events
The attackers left notes connecting their actions to the hostilities between the Ottoman and British Empires, which had been officially declared in October 1914. Believing he would be killed, Gool Mahomed left a letter in his waist-belt which stated that he was a subject of the Ottoman Sultan and that, "I must kill you and give my life for my faith, Allāhu Akbar." Mullah Abdullah said in his last letter that he was dying for his faith and in obedience to the order of the Sultan, "but owing to my grudge against Chief Sanitary Inspector Brosnan it was my intention to kill him first." Turkish sources claim that the letter from the Ottoman Sultan was a forgery, and that the Turkish flag found with the perpetrators was planted. It is claimed that the incident was attributed to Turks in order to rally the Australian public for the war.

The actions were seen as representative of enemy aliens and Germans in the area were the focus of violence, as it was believed that the Germans had agitated the assailants to attack. On the evening of Friday 1 January an angry mob burnt the local German Club to the ground, cutting the hoses of the firemen who came to fight the flames. Afterwards, the mob marched over to a nearby camp used by Afghan camel drivers, but were prevented from attacking the settlement by the police and military. There was no further violence against the Afghan community.

The next day the mines of Broken Hill fired all employees deemed enemy aliens under the 1914 Commonwealth War Precautions Act. Six Austrians, four Germans and one Turk were ordered out of town by the public. Shortly afterwards, all enemy aliens in Australia were interned for the duration of the war.

On Sunday 3 January thousands of people assembled in Broken Hill to witness the funerals of the four victims.

The Silverton Tramway Company refunded in full the fares for the picnic train, and the money was used to launch a public relief fund.

German propaganda
The Sydney journal The Bulletin published a burlesque of the incident in the style of German propaganda, suggesting the Germans lauded the attack as a victorious military battle between Turkish forces and recruits on a troop train. Supposedly the Turkish attackers killed 40 and wounded 70 (ten times the real figures) for the loss of only two dead. The parody was, for some reason, taken seriously by other newspapers, which published it almost verbatim as a genuine example of German propaganda. The story was picked up by international papers in the US, the UK and NZ. When clippings from the foreign papers filtered back to Australia in the letters home of serving soldiers, it only reinforced the belief that the story in the Bulletin was true. The 'fake news' was revived as an example of German mendacity by Australian papers during the Second World War and even as late as 1951 in Broken Hill's own Barrier Daily Truth paper.

Recently
In the late 1970s there were failed attempts to turn the story into a film, The Battle of Broken Hill, to be directed by Donald Crombie.

Nicholas Shakespeare wrote the novella Oddfellows (2015) based on this event.

The battle is the subject of the song "Battle of Broken Hill" by the Sydney-based Celtic-punk band Handsome Young Strangers, found on their 2016 EP of the same name.

In 2014 the Greek Australian genocides scholar Panayiotis Diamadis noted that the attack occurred only a few weeks after the declaration of jihad (holy war) on 14 November 1914 by Sultan Mehmed V and Shaykh al-Islām (primary religious leader) Essad Effendi of the Ottoman Empire against Great Britain and the Allies.

The Australian government refused requests to fund a commemoration of the event for its 100th anniversary. A ceremony marking the centenary of the massacre was held at Broken Hill railway station on 1 January 2015.

References

External links
Sharing the Lode: The Broken Hill Migrant Story
The Battle of Broken Hill film
Battle of Broken Hill, Postcards TV show visits the area
"Broken Hill Picnic Train Massacre"  by Brendan Whyte in Strategy & Tactics, no. 231, pp. 30–31, November/December 2005 (11 MB)

Attacks during the New Year celebrations
Broken Hill
Mass murder in 1915
History of Broken Hill
1915 in Australia
Broken Hill
Crime in New South Wales
Massacres in Australia
History of Australia (1901–1945)
Spree shootings in Australia
Islam in Australia
January 1915 events
1915 murders in Australia
1910s mass shootings in Australia